James Caulfeild may refer to:

James Caulfeild, 1st Earl of Charlemont (1728–1799), Irish statesman
James Caulfeild, 3rd Earl of Charlemont (1820–1892), Irish politician and peer
James Caulfeild, 8th Viscount Charlemont (1880–1949), Irish peer, Northern Ireland politician
James Caulfeild (soldier) (1782–1852), soldier and MP for Abingdon